Air Vice Marshal Sir Hazelton Robson Nicholl,  (14 January 1882 – 14 August 1956) was a Royal Air Force officer who served as Air Officer Commanding-in-Chief RAF Middle East from 1938 to 1939.

Military career
Nicholl served as a private soldier in the London Scottish Volunteers in the Second Boer War and then transferred to the South Rhodesia Volunteers in 1903. He was commissioned into the Royal Flying Corps Special Reserve in 1915 during the First World War and served as a pilot with No. 8 Squadron before instructing at the Central Flying School and then becoming Officer Commanding No. 84 Squadron and subsequently Officer Commanding No. 110 Squadron on the Western Front.

After the war, Nicholl became a Staff Officer at the Air Ministry before being appointed Officer Commanding No. 70 Squadron in 1926. He was made Deputy Director of Training and then Deputy Director of Personal Services before becoming Deputy Director of Manning at the Air Ministry in 1931. He went on to be Station Commander at RAF Calshot in 1932, Air Officer Commanding No. 23 Group in 1933 and Air Officer Commanding Central Area in 1934. After that he was made a Member of the Air Board of the Royal Australian Air Force in 1935, Air Officer Commanding-in-Chief RAF Middle East in 1938 and Air Officer for Administration at Headquarters Fighter Command in 1939, the post he held in the early years of the Second World War. He retired in 1942.

Later life
Nicholl retired to Scotland and became Controller of the RAF Benevolent Fund.

References

|-

1882 births
1956 deaths
British Army personnel of the Second Boer War
British Army personnel of World War I
Chevaliers of the Légion d'honneur
Companions of the Order of the Bath
Knights Commander of the Order of the British Empire
London Scottish soldiers
Royal Air Force air marshals of World War II
Royal Flying Corps officers